Heart Full of Rage is the debut studio album by American rapper and singer Tyla Yaweh. It was released by Epic Records and London Entertainment on February 22, 2019. The album features guest appearances from French Montana and PnB Rock. It is supported by the singles "Gemini" and "High Right Now".

Background 
Yaweh had released several singles from 2017 until the release of Heart Full of Rage in 2019. None of his prior singles were on the album, except for "Gemini", which was released on May 11, 2018.

Touring 
After the release of Heart Full of Rage, Yaweh toured in support of the album's songs, performing both albums tracks and his other songs. He was one of the support acts for Post Malone's Runaway Tour, on which he performed over half of the album's songs. He joined Malone, along with Swae Lee and DJ eNice, on both legs of the Runaway Tour.

Track listing

Personnel 
 Dre London – executive producer
 Tes Siyoum – executive producer
 Nick Mac – engineer, assistant engineer, recording engineer, mixing engineer
 Colin Leonard – mastering engineer
 Jason Wilkerson – mastering engineer
 Kevin Davis – mixing engineer
 Simon Says – recording engineer

Charts

References 

2019 albums